The English Twenty20 cricket champions are the winners of the England and Wales Cricket Board (ECB) Twenty20 competition for first-class cricket counties, most recently the Friends Life t20, although from 2014 this has been replaced with the NatWest t20 Blast. The competition culminates with 'Finals Day': a single day on which both semi-finals and the final are contested at the same ground. Kent Spitfires are the current champions, claiming their second title in the 2021 season.

Twenty20 cricket was developed by the ECB to attract new, younger audiences to cricket. Replacing the 50 overs-per-side 'Benson & Hedges Cup', the 'Twenty20 Cup' was introduced in 2003, and was over two hours shorter than its predecessor, and matches also featured greater entertainment off the field, such as live music, barbecues, fancy dress and karaoke. The competition was rebranded as the 'Friends Provident t20' in 2010, and a season later as the 'Friends Life t20'. In 2014, the competition became known as the NatWest t20 Blast. For the first seven years of the competition, teams were allowed one overseas player, as in the other domestic tournaments, but from the 2010 season, each team was allowed two. The finalists in both 2009 and 2011 qualified for the Champions League Twenty20, an international competition between the leading domestic teams from the major cricketing nations.

The competition was won in its inaugural season by Surrey, and in the twenty seasons that it has run, it has been won by thirteen different counties. Leicestershire and Hampshire have won the competition on the most occasions, doing so three times. Somerset have contested more finals than any other team; after winning the competition in 2005, they were losing finalists in 2009, 2010, 2011 and 2021.

Men's champions

Performance by county (Men's)

Women's Champions

Performance by team (Women's)

Notes

References

General

Specific

English cricket lists
Friends Life t20
Twenty20 Cup
English champions